Liberty Street was a Canadian drama television series, which aired on CBC Television in 1995. An ensemble cast drama, it centred on the tenants of an apartment building in Toronto, Ontario.

Produced by Kit Hood and Linda Schuyler, the team behind the long-running Degrassi series of television shows, Liberty Street was an attempt to create a similar series depicting the lives of a group of young adults living on their own for the first time.

Background
The pilot film, X-Rated, aired on February 27, 1994. Although it was picked up to series, it was retitled as Liberty Street and some of the roles were rewritten and recast.

The series premiered on January 11, 1995, with 13 episodes in its first season. It was renewed for a second season, which premiered on September 16, 1995. After the second season completed its run in late fall 1995, the CBC announced in February 1996 that it would not renew the series for a third season.

Characters
The show's characters included Mack Fischer (Joel Bissonnette), the superintendent of the building and a recovering drug addict; Frank Pagnozzi (Pat Mastroianni), the nephew of the building's owner; Janet Beecher (Kimberly Huie), a single mother and law student; Marsha Velasquez (Marcia Laskowski) and Nathan Jones (Billy Merasty), roommates who are also coworkers at a bike courier company where Nathan is having problems with their supervisor because he's gay; and Annie Hamer (Henriette Ivanans), Frank's ex-girlfriend. The cast also included Katherine Ashby, Richard Zeppieri, Dean Paras, L. Dean Ifill and Jhene Erwin.

The apartment building was known as the "Epitome" — an insider reference to Epitome Pictures, the company which produced the series — but was nicknamed by the characters as "the Pit".

The original pilot's cast had also included Gordon Michael Woolvett as Tony Foster, the owner of the building, and Stacie Mistysyn as River, who was renamed Annie in the series.

In the second season, four new characters were added: Ben (Hamish McEwan), a civil servant; Cynthia (Nahanni Johnstone), a style-conscious woman with designs on marrying Frank; Lionel (Jim Codrington), Janet's ex-boyfriend; and James (Keith Knight), Nathan's new partner.

Production
Most of the show was shot in and around the Liberty Village area of Toronto.

The series received a $250,000 grant from the federal Ministry of Health to include health promotion messaging in the scripts, including Mack's addiction recovery, Marsha's struggle to quit smoking cigarettes, and an anti-homophobia episode in which Nathan was gay-bashed.

After writer Russell Smith criticized the show's dialogue in a panel discussion on CBC Radio's media analysis show Now the Details, head writer Barry Stevens hired Smith as a dialogue consultant.

Liberty Street was also one of the first Canadian television series ever to have its own dedicated website.

Episodes

Season One
 "That Was Then, This Is Now"
 "Sex, Lies and Pasta Putanesca"
 "Voyage to the Bottom of the Pit"
 "Planes, Kids and Automobiles"
 "Caged Heat"
 "The Dating Game"
 "No Ifs, Ands or Butts"
 "Naked Truth"
 "Even Bradys Get the Blues"
 "The Mouse That Roared"
 "Saturday Night Fever"
 "All You Need Is Love: Part 1"
 "All You Need Is Love: Part 2"

Season Two
 "Reality Bites Back"
 "Crimes and Misdemeanours"
 "For Love and Money"
 "All Work and No Play"
 "Return of the Soldier"
 "Lies I Told My Father"
 "Friends and Lovers"
 "Hiring and Firing"
 "Secret Games"
 "In the Heat of the Night"
 "Decisions, Decisions"
 "Bringing Up Baby"
 "The Long Goodbye"

References

External links

1990s Canadian drama television series
CBC Television original programming
1995 Canadian television series debuts
1995 Canadian television series endings
Television shows set in Toronto
Television series by DHX Media
1990s Canadian LGBT-related drama television series